Claire Elizabeth Coffee (born April 14, 1980) is an American actress. She is best known for her role as Adalind Schade in the NBC fantasy drama Grimm.

Early life
Coffee grew up in Monterey, California. She attended the Santa Catalina School for girls and has a degree in Theatre from Northwestern University.

Career
She had a recurring role on The West Wing as Cassie Tatum in 2003. Between 2007 and 2009, Coffee played nurse Nadine Crowell on General Hospital. Most recently, she played attorney Janie Ross on the TNT series Franklin & Bash and appeared for six seasons on the NBC series Grimm as the Hexenbiest Adalind Schade.

Personal life
Coffee married musician Chris Thile on December 23, 2013, at Blackberry Farm, Walland, Tennessee. On May 19, 2015, Coffee announced the birth of their son, Calvin Eugene Thile. Coffee resided with her son and husband in Portland, Oregon, where the show Grimm was filmed, until 2016. The family now resides in Brooklyn, New York.

Filmography
Section source:

Film

Television

Video games

References

External links
 

1980 births
Living people
Actresses from San Francisco
American soap opera actresses
American television actresses
Northwestern University School of Communication alumni
21st-century American actresses